Ragamala paintings are a form of Indian miniature painting, a set of illustrative paintings of the Ragamala or "Garland of Ragas", depicting variations of the Indian musical modes called ragas. They stand as a classical example of the amalgamation of art, poetry and classical music in medieval India.

Ragamala paintings were created in most schools of Indian painting, starting in the 16th and 17th centuries, and are today named accordingly as Pahari Ragamala, Rajasthan or Rajput Ragamala, Deccan Ragamala, and Mughal Ragamala.

Also it originated in Rajasthan.

In these painting each raga is personified by a colour, mood, a verse describing a story of a hero and heroine (nayaka and nayika), it also elucidates the season and the time of day and night in which a particular raga is to be sung; and finally most paintings also demarcate the specific Hindu deities attached with the raga, like Bhairava or Bhairavi to Shiva, Sri to Devi etc. The paintings depict not just the Ragas, but also their wives, (raginis), their numerous sons (ragaputra) and daughters (ragaputri).

The six principal ragas present in the Ragamala are Bhairava, Dipika, Sri, Malkaunsa, Megha and Hindola and these are meant to be sung during the six seasons of the year – summer, monsoon, autumn, early winter, winter and spring.

History

Sangita Ratnakara is an important 12th century CE treatise on the classification of Indian Ragas, which for the first time mentions the presiding deity of each raga.
From the 14th century onwards, they were described in short verses in Sanskrit, for dhyana, 'contemplation', and later depicted in a series of paintings, called the Ragamala paintings.
Some of the best available works of Ragamala are from the 16th and 17th centuries, when the form flourished under royal patronage, though by the 19th century, it gradually faded.

Extant works

In 1570, Kshemakarna, a priest of Rewa in Central India, compiled a poetic text on the Ragamala in Sanskrit, which describes six principal Ragas—Bhairava, Malakoshika, Hindola, Deepak, Shri, and Megha—each having five Raginis and eight Ragaputras, except Raga Shri, which has six Raginis and nine Ragaputras, thus making a Ragamala family of 86 members

Most of the extant works of Ragamala are from Deccan style, where Ibrahim Adil Shah II of Bijapur, was himself also a fine painter and illustrator, though some Rajput style also exist of which the work of an artist of the 'Chawand' (a part of Mewar) school of painting, Sahibdin, whose Ragamala (musical modes) series dated 1628, are now in National Museum of India

Ragamala sets discovered in Odisha are in the Pattachitra style, based on the ragas of Odissi music and show distinct iconography and raga groups from other regions.

The Ragas in Ragamala
Six are male (parent) ragas; the thirty raginis are their wives and the remaining forty-eight are their sons. These are listed is as follows:

(1) Parent Raga: Bhairav raga
Wives: Bhairavi, Bilawali, Punyaki, Bangli, Aslekhi.
Sons: Pancham, Harakh, Disakh, Bangal, Madhu, Madhava, Lalit, Bilaval.

(2) Parent Raga: Malkaus raga
Wives: Gaundkari, Devagandhari, Gandhari, Seehute, Dhanasri. Sons: Maru, Mustang, Mewara, Parbal, Chand, Khokhat, Bhora, Nad.

(3) Parent Raga: Hindol raga
Wives: Telangi, Devkari, Basanti, Sindhoori, Aheeri.
Sons: Surmanand, Bhasker, Chandra-Bimb, Mangalan, Ban, Binoda, Basant, Kamoda.

(4) Parent Raga: Deepak raga
Wives: Kachheli, Patmanjari, Todi, Kamodi, Gujri.
Sons: Kaalanka, Kuntal, Rama, Kamal, Kusum, Champak, Gaura, Kanra [36].

(5) Parent Raga: Sri raga
Wives: Bairavi, Karnati, Gauri, Asavari, Sindhavi.
Sons: Salu, Sarag, Sagra, Gaund, Gambhir, Gund, Kumbh, Hamir.

(6) Parent Raga: Megh raga
Wives: Sorath, Gaundi-Malari, Asa, Gunguni, Sooho.
Sons: Biradhar, Gajdhar, Kedara, Jablidhar, Nut, Jaldhara, Sankar, Syama.

Gallery

References

Further reading
 Moghul Ragamala: Painted Indian Melodies and the Poetry of Kshemakarna, by Ludwig V. Habighorst. Koblenz: Ragaputra Edition, 2006.
Ragamala Paintings from India, the collection of Claudio Moscatelli, by Glynn, Skelton, Dallapiccola. Philip Wilson Publishers in association with Dulwich Picture Gallery Museum and Art Gallery London 2011

External links

 Ragamala, a study of Indian Ragas
 Ragamala Paintings, Cornell University Digital Collections

Ragas
Hindustani ragas
Artifacts in the collection of the Smithsonian Institution
Indian painting
Schools of Indian painting